Naujieji Elmininkai is a village in Anykščiai district municipality, in Utena County, in northeast Lithuania. According to the 2011 census, the village has a population of 573 people.

The village has Elmininkų manor, a library. 

There is Šeimyniškelių hillfort near the Elmininkai village.

References

Anykščiai District Municipality
Villages in Utena County